The 2013 Illinois State Redbirds football team represented Illinois State University as a member of the Missouri Valley Football Conference (MVFC) during the 2013 NCAA Division I FCS football season. Led by fifth-year head coach Brock Spack, the Redbirds compiled an overall record of 5–6 with a mark of 4–4 in conference play, placing sixth in the MVFC. Illinois State  played home games at Hancock Stadium in Normal, Illinois.

Schedule

Ranking movements

Redbirds drafted

References

Illinois State
Illinois State Redbirds football seasons
Illinois State Redbirds football